Isadore Freed (March 26, 1900 – November 10, 1960) was a Jewish composer of Belarusian birth.

Biography
Born in Brest-Litovsk, now Brest, Belarus, Freed's family emigrated to the United States when Freed was three years old and settled in Philadelphia, where his father owned a music store.  Freed began playing piano at age seven, and began composing at age nine.

Freed's formal music education was at the University of Pennsylvania, where he earned a bachelor's degree at the age of 18.  After graduation from Penn, Freed briefly held a teaching post at The Curtis Institute of Music. In 1924, he married Riva Hoffmann, a dancer in Isadora Duncan's troupe.  Following this Freed went to Berlin where he briefly studied piano with Josef Weiss, and then to Paris where he studied composition with Ernest Bloch, Nadia Boulanger, Louis Vierne and Vincent d'Indy.  He also studied piano with Józef Hofmann and George Bayle, and organ with Rollo Maitland.

Freed returned to the United States in 1934, and shortly after he was employed by the composition department at Temple University from the mid-1930s until the mid-1940s, but sources disagree as to the dates of his appointment.  In 1944, Freed was named head of the composition department at the Hartt School of Music (now known simply as The Hartt School), where he taught in various capacities until his death in 1960.  In 1951 he was also hired as Harmony instructor at the Hebrew Union School of Sacred Music.  He also served as a radio commentator for performances of the Philadelphia Orchestra, and edited a number of scores in conjunction with Lazare Saminsky.

Freed died in Rockville Centre, New York on November 10, 1960.

Freed's work

Freed's primary contribution to scholarly discourse is his book, Harmonizing the Jewish Modes, a theoretical treatise discussing Jewish sacred music in the context of Western European music theory, particularly the synagogue mode and its lack of a strong tonic-dominant relationship.

Freed was also active as a synagogue musician, acting as organist and choirmaster at Temple Keneseth Israel in Philadelphia.  His work as a synagogue musician led him to compose Jewish liturgical works, beginning with his Sacred Service for Shabbat Morning, published in 1939.  Many feel that this is his most enduring musical work.

In 1946, he was commissioned by the Julius Hartt Foundation to write an opera, The Princess and the Vagabond which was premiered at the Hartt School two years later.  In 1944 he received prizes for two works:  Triptych for violin, viola, violoncello and piano, and Postscripts, a choral work which won the Eurydice Choral Prize. His Rhapsody for Trombone and Orchestra, received a radio broadcast premiere in New York in 1951.

After the composer's death, the National Jewish Music Council published a brief biography of Freed, A Jewish Composer by Choice: Isadore Freed, His Life and Work, which contains reminiscences of Freed's life and works by friends and colleagues including Pierre Monteux, who programmed Freed's Jeux de Timbres for concerts in San Francisco and Amsterdam in 1937, the same year in which Freed became the first American composer to be guest conductor for the NBC Symphony Orchestra.

Freed was both a secular and sacred composer with deep interest in Jewish liturgical music as well as the promotion of contemporary secular music, being a co-founder of the Philadelphia Society for Contemporary Music and the Philadelphia Chamber Orchestra and Composers' Laboratory, the latter of which was superseded by the WPA Music Project Composers' Forum Laboratory.

References

Grove Music Online. Oxford; New York: Oxford University Press, 1999.

Ewen, David. American Composers Today : A Biographical and Critical Guide. New York: H. W. Wilson Co., 1949.

Freed, Isadore. Harmonizing the Jewish Modes. New York: Sacred Music Press of the Hebrew Union College, Jewish Institute of Religion, 1958.

———. Triptych : For Violin, Viola, 'Cello and Piano. New York: G. Schirmer, 1945.
 
———. Jeux De Timbres : Suite Symphonique. Paris; New York: M. Eschig; Associated Music Publishers, 1934.

Ho, Allan Benedict and Dmitry Feofanov. Biographical Dictionary of Russian/Soviet Composers. New York: Greenwood Press, 1989.

National Jewish Music Council and Abraham Wolf Binder. A Jewish Composer by Choice: Isadore Freed, His Life and Work : A Program Handbook. New York: National Jewish Music Council, sponsored by the National Jewish Welfare Board, 1961.

Randel, Don Michael. The Harvard Biographical Dictionary of Music. Harvard University Press Reference Library. Cambridge, Mass.: Belknap Press of Harvard University Press, 1996.

Slonimsky, Nicolas. Baker's Biographical Dictionary of Musicians. Centennial ed. New York: Schirmer Books, 2001.

External links
Jewish Music Resource Center, Thesaurus of Jewish Music: Isadore Freed.
 Bach Cantatas.com ; Isadore Freed

Belarusian composers
1900 births
1960 deaths
Belarusian Jews
People from Brest, Belarus
Emigrants from the Russian Empire to the United States
American people of Belarusian-Jewish descent
University of Pennsylvania alumni
Curtis Institute of Music faculty
Temple University faculty
University of Hartford Hartt School faculty
20th-century composers